The chair law, officially «Law Nº 2951, which establishes the rights of particular employees to rest in chairs», was a Chilean law which came into effect on 7 December 1914 under the government of Ramón Barros Luco, which obligated owners of commercial establishments to provide chairs for their employees. It was one of the first achievements of movements for worker's rights which sprang up during the end of the 19th century in Chile. While no longer on the books, the same right is provided by the modern Chilean Labor Code of 1994.

History 
The original version of the law consisted of three articles. Article I established that "an employer shall maintain a sufficient number of seats or chairs at the disposal of their employees". Article II established the right to have a break of at least one hour and a half for lunch. Article 3 established that "a fine of ten pesos be paid into the communal coffers" by employers for each violation of the law, and empowered municipalities to enforce compliance with the law.

In 1931, the chair law, along with other Chilean labor laws existing up to that time, was included among the provisions of Decreto con Fuerza de Ley ("Decree which has the force of law", DFL) 178 by the Ministry of Health, which included the first Chilean Labor Code, el which was legally valid until 1987. The contents of the law was found in Title V of Book II of the DFL, titled «On chairs in industrial and commercial establishments», in articles 333–335.

As of 1994, the contents of the law are found in Title I, Book II, Article 193 of the Chilean Labor Code of 1994.

See also 

 Labor laws
 Workers rights

References 

Chairs
Chilean labour law
1914 in Chilean law